Chandler: Red Tide is a 1976 illustrated novel, an early form of graphic novel, by writer-artist Jim Steranko.

The digest-sized book combines typeset text with two same-sized illustrations per page, utilizing no word balloons or other traditional comics text conventions. A hard-boiled detective novel in the film noir style, its protagonist is a private detective named Chandler (an homage to author Raymond Chandler) who is hired by a man who claims to have been poisoned by the same people responsible for a notorious gangland slaying.  As Chandler tracks down witnesses, each begins to turn up dead.

Publication history

Packaged by Byron Preiss Visual Publications and published by Pyramid Books, under vice-president Norman Goldfind, in 1976, Chandler was written, drawn, and colored by veteran comics creator Jim Steranko. There is an introduction by crime novelist and former San Francisco private detective Joe Gores, and a foreword by Preiss. The original cover price was one dollar.

Preiss said the book was "created to retail at American newsstands alongside hundreds of other paperback offerings". The mass-market edition, which Preiss said had a "50,000+ press run", was the third in a series from the publisher, and also known as Fiction Illustrated Vol. 3. (See image at left.) It was supplemented by a separate edition for bookstores that was double the dimensions of the newsstand edition. Steranko, through his company Supergraphics, additionally offered the latter in a limited edition of 750 with a signed and numbered signature plate.

Steranko in 1978 recalled the project's genesis: 

He elsewhere said that in creating the book he used golden sectioning, "a mathematical formula to arrange elements in a unified structure, to create an image-to-text relationship that readers would be very comfortable with. The text on any given page related only to that page".

Steranko, who retained rights to the character, was then assigned to create a 12-page "Chandler" story for Penthouse magazine, working with executive editor Art Cooper. When Cooper departed Penthouse, the project was canceled and Steranko was paid a kill fee.

Dark Horse Comics had planned to publish a revised edition of Chandler: Red Tide in December 1999, with revamped and more hardboiled art and text by Steranko, but this did not see fruition. Dark Horse Presents vol. 3, No. 3 (Aug. 2011) included a 13-page Chapter 1 of Red Tide.

Reception

Chandler: Red Tide did not meet sales expectations, with Steranko recalling in 2003 that, "When the book appeared it was not embraced by the comic-book community because it didn't have word balloons or captions. Believe it or not, they found that shocking!" In 1978, shortly after the book's publication, he said, "I was disappointed in Pyramid's distribution and promotion of it. ... They did a major mailing on it, but there was more that can be done".

Illustrated-novel format
Chandler: Red Tide is similar to Harold Foster's comic strip Prince Valiant in that the narrative is carried by a combination of graphics and text blocks without word balloons. Steranko used the term "graphic novel" in his introduction, though it was labeled "a visual novel" on the cover.

References

External links
The Drawings of Steranko: Red Tide (fan site)

1976 graphic novels
American graphic novels
Detective comics
Pyramid Books books